Good Machine Productions was an American independent film production, film distribution, and foreign sales company started in the early 1990 by its co-founders and producers, Ted Hope and James Schamus. David Linde joined as a partner in the late 1990s and also started the international sales company Good Machine International. They sold the company to Universal Pictures, where it was then merged with USA Films and Universal Focus to create Focus Features. Hope, along with the heads of production development and business affairs (Anthony Bregman, Anne Carey, and Diana Victor) then went on to form the independent production company This Is That Productions. Schamus and Linde became co-presidents of Focus Features.

In 2001, the Museum of Modern Art celebrated the tenth anniversary of Good Machine's work, commemorating their support of international and domestic filmmakers.

Background
Good Machine was involved in production and/or distribution of a number of films, including Ang Lee's The Ice Storm and Ride with the Devil; Hal Hartley projects such as Flirt (1995), Edward Burns's The Brothers McMullen and Todd Solondz's Happiness.

History
Launched in 1990 from a small loft space in lower Manhattan by writer/producer/Columbia professor James Schamus and his partner, Ted Hope, Good Machine produced many important independent films over the years, among them Safe (Todd Haynes, 1995) and The Wedding Banquet (Ang Lee, 1993). The company survived by doing line producing for hire and keeping overhead costs low. Many films were commercially successful thanks to centrist marketing strategies. David Linde joining in 1997 and creating the foreign sales company gave Schamus, Hope and Linde greater control of Good Machine's products, increased financing sources, and provided information about what people in the marketplace wanted. In 1997, it was announced that Good Machine would become the foreign sales agent of films produced and distributed by October Films, in order to acquire worldwide rights of the films. In 1998, it struck a deal with Universal. Previously, the company had a one-time production deal with 20th Century Fox, which was signed in 1996. It was dismantled in 2002, when it merged with Focus Features.

Disbandment
In 2003, Good Machine was acquired by Universal Pictures. James Schamus and David Linde remained with Universal, serving as co-presidents of Focus Features.

Ted Hope chose to part with the company to form the This is that Corporation (This Is That Productions) with Good Machine Director of Development Anne Carey, Director of Production Anthony Bregman, and Director of Business Affairs Diana Victor. Under the This Is That banner they produced films such as Adventureland, The Savages, and Eternal Sunshine of the Spotless Mind.

Filmography 
 The Hours and Times (1991) — US distribution
 Keep It for Yourself (1991) — coproduced with Allarts
 Pushing Hands (1991) ― coproduced with Central Motion Pictures
 Simple Men (1992) — coproduced with Fine Line Features
 The Wedding Banquet (1993) ― coproduced with Central Motion Pictures
 Eat Drink Man Woman (1994) ― coproduced with Central Motion Pictures
 What Happened Was (1994) — coproduced with Genre Films
 The Brothers McMullen (1995) – coproduced with Videography Prods.
 Flirt (1995) 
 Safe (1995) — coproduced with American Playhouse and Channel Four Films
 She's the One (1996) — coproduced with Marlboro Road Gang Productions and South Fork Pictures
 Walking and Talking (1996) — coproduced with Channel Four Films, Zenith Productions, Pandora Film, PolyGram Filmed Entertainment, Makido Films (France), Electric, and TEAM Communications Group
 The Ice Storm (1997)
 The Myth of Fingerprints (1997) — Sony Pictures Classics
 Office Killer (1997) — coproduced with Strand, Kardana/Swinsky Films, and Good Fear
 Happiness (1998) — Good Machine Releasing
 No Looking Back (1998) — coproduced with Polygram Filmed Entertainment Group, Marlboro Road Gang, and South Fork Pictures 
 Xiu Xiu: The Sent Down Girl (1998) — Good Machine International
 The Lifestyle (1999) — coproduced with Swinging T Productions
 Ride with the Devil (1999) — coproduced with USA Films
 Trick (1999) — coproduced with Fine Line Features
 Crouching Tiger, Hidden Dragon (2000) — Good Machine International; coproduced with Asian Union Film & Entertainment, China Film Co-Productions Corporation, Sony Pictures Classics, Columbia Pictures Film Production Asia, Edko Films, and Zoom Hunt Productions
 The Tao of Steve (2000) — Sony Pictures Classics
 Buffalo Soldiers (2001) — coproduced with FilmFour, Grosvenor Park Productions, and Odeon Film
 Human Nature (2001) — co-produced with StudioCanal
 In the Bedroom (2001) — coproduced with Eastern Standard Film Company and GreeneStreet Films
 Lovely & Amazing (2001) — coproduced with Blow Up Pictures
 The Man Who Wasn't There (2001) — coproduced with Working Title Films, Gramercy Pictures, Mike Zoss Productions, and Constantin Film
 Storytelling (2001) — coproduced with Killer Films and New Line Cinema
 Y Tu Mamá También (2001) — Good Machine International
 Adaptation (2002) — coproduced with Columbia Pictures, Intermedia, and Propaganda Films
 The Laramie Project (2002) — coproduced with HBO Films
 American Splendor (2003) — coproduced with Dark Horse Entertainment, and HBO Films
 Hulk (2003) — coproduced with Marvel Enterprises, and Valhalla Motion Pictures

References

External links
 Contemporary Independent Film

Film production companies of the United States
Universal Pictures
Companies disestablished in 2003
Companies based in New York City
American independent film studios
Companies established in the 1990s